Trith-Saint-Léger is a commune in the Nord department in northern France.

Population

Heraldry

See also
Communes of the Nord department

References

External links
 Photos of the LME steel works in Trith

Trithsaintleger